The following is a list of operational airlines in the United Kingdom. For British Overseas Territories, see the sections for Anguilla, Bermuda, British Virgin Islands, Cayman Islands, Falkland Islands, Montserrat, Turks and Caicos Islands.

Scheduled airlines

Charter airlines

Cargo airlines

Helicopter airlines/general aviation

Channel Islands and the Isle of Man

See also
 Lists of airlines
 List of defunct airlines of the United Kingdom

References

United Kingdom
Airlines